General Burnside Island State Park is a park located just south of Somerset, Kentucky in Pulaski County. The park encompasses  in the middle of Lake Cumberland, making it Kentucky's only island park. The park is named for General Ambrose E. Burnside, a Union general during the Civil War who stationed his troops at the location that the park now occupies.

Activities and amenities
Referred to locally as Burnside Island, the state park offers camping, golf, and lake access via boat ramp on the south end of the island. The golf course was voted first place as the Commonwealth Journal Readers Choice Award for "Best Places to Play Golf" in 2009. The following year, it placed second.

Although elected officials have spoken of upgrades to the park, including the construction of a state lodge and improvements to the golf course, a spokesperson in 2010 said the Kentucky Tourism, Arts and Heritage Cabinet has no plans for a lodge "right now."

References

State parks of Kentucky
Protected areas of Pulaski County, Kentucky